Nilavilakku is a traditional lamp used commonly in Kerala as well as in Tamil nadu (called Kuthuvillakku). The traditional lamps which is lit during every auspicious occasions; in temples before the worship starts; at the official and unofficial functions.

Etymology

Nilam in the Malayalam/Tamil language means floor or the ground and vilakku means lamp.

Usage

Original usage in Hinduism
The Nilavilakku is integral to several rituals and ceremonies in Hindu families in Kerala. As the sun sets, young girls of the family bring the lighted lamps to the verandah of the house, continued with evening prayers. In the evening the ritual is repeated alongside evening prayers. In Hindu temples, various types of Nilavilakku like 'Kutthuvilakku', 'Thookkuvilakku' etc are used and are very much related to the traditional beliefs and activities in Kerala.

Lighting the Nilavilakku on any occasion is believed to be auspicious. Nilavilakku plays an important role in the presentation of various art forms. The art forms are performed after lighting the lamp. In Kerala, many functions are inaugurated by lighting Nilavilakku.

Nilavilakku is usually made of bronze or brass. Usually cotton wicks doused in oil or ghee are used for lighting the lamp. There are three ways of lighting the lamp. In one, only one wick is lit and is directed towards the deity or sacred space and in another there are two lit wicks in two directions. The third alternative is with five wicks in five directions.

Adoption by other religions

Christianity 
With the reach of Christianity in Kerala, Saint Thomas Christians (or Syrian Christians) also started keeping Nilavilakku in their churches and homes. Traditionally, the nilavilakku is lighted and kept at the main front entrance of a home. Syrian Christian art forms like Margamkali and Parichamuttukali are performed around nilavilakku. A special type of Nilavilakku, called Aal Vilakku is used in Temples of South India, especially in Kerala.

Islam 
It can also be found in certain Muslim mosques like Ponnani Al Maqtoom Juma Masjid and Jarams (holy caves) in Kerala,

See also
 Other lamps
 Butter lamp
 Diya lamp
 Nachiarkoil lamp
 Sky lantern
 Paper lantern
 Types of Indian oil lamps
 Related topics
 Aarti
 Diwali
 Rangoli
 List of light sources

References

Culture of Kerala
Types of lamp
Indian furniture